The Assistant Chief of the General Staff and Army Chief of Staff is a senior role in the British Army.

Responsibilities
The Assistant Chief of the General Staff supports the Chief of the General Staff in his responsibilities, sets the conditions for the British Army to contribute to success on operations, ensures coherence across the 'Defence Lines of Development' and develops the Army of the Future. The officer is an Army Board member responsible for the Army’s international engagement strategy and the British Army’s internal and external communications policy.  As the Army’s senior officer in the Ministry of Defence, he or she provides the gearing between the Ministry of Defence and Army Headquarters. The title of the existing ACGS will be renamed as Director Engagement and Communications (D E&C) on 3 September 2018. The responsibilities of D E&C will deliver the British Army’s communications, both internally, across Defence, across Government, and to the UK public and international partners. On the other hand, the role of the Assistant Chief of the General Staff (ACGS) and Army Chief of Staff (ACOS) will be responsible for directing and delivering the Army’s input into Defence planning. The current Director Strategy, Major General James Swift, will attain the title of ACGS and ACOS and his previous title of Director Strategy will disappear.

Assistant Chiefs
Assistant Chiefs of the Imperial General Staff:
 Major-General Laurence Carr (1939–1940)
 Major-General Arthur Percival (Apr 1940 – Jul 1940)
 Major-General Desmond Anderson (May 1940 – Jul 1940)
 Lieutenant-General Gordon Macready (Oct 1940 – Jun 1942)
 Major-General Daril Watson (Jun 1942 – Dec 1942)
 Major-General John Evetts (Dec 1942 – Aug 1944)
 Major-General John Kennedy (Oct 1943 – Feb 1945)
 Major-General Vyvyan Evelegh (Aug 1944–1945)
 Major-General Frank Simpson (Feb 1945 – Feb 1946)

Assistant Chiefs of the General Staff:
 Major-General William Jackson (1968–1970)
 Major-General Ian Gill (1970–1972)
 Major-General Frank Caldwell (1972–1974)
 Major-General Hugh Cunningham (1974–1975)
 Major-General Henry Roper (1975–1978)
 Major-General Ian Baker (1978–1980)
 Major-General Maurice Johnston (Jan 1980 – Dec 1980)
 Major-General Robert Pascoe (1980–1983)
 Major-General Laurence New (1983–1984)
 Major-General John MacMillan (1984–1987)
 Major-General Charles Guthrie (1987–1989)
 Major-General Richard Swinburn (1989–1990)
 Major-General Roger Wheeler (1990–1992)
 Major-General Michael Walker (1992–1994)
 Major-General Timothy Granville-Chapman (1994–1996)
 Major-General Michael Willcocks (1996–1999)
 Major-General Kevin O'Donoghue (1999–2001)
 Major-General Richard Dannatt (2001–2002)
 Major-General David Richards (2002–2005)
 Major-General Bill Rollo (2005–2007)
 Major-General Simon Mayall (2007–2009)
 Major-General James Bucknall (2009–2010)
 Major General Richard Barrons (2010–2011)
 Major-General James Everard (2011–2013)
 Major-General David Cullen (2013–2015)
 Major-General Nick Welch (2015–2018)
 Major General Rupert Jones (Jan 2018–Sep 2018)
 Major General James Swift (Sep 2018–Nov 2018)
 Major General Ralph Wooddisse (November 2018-March 2021)
 Major General Nick Perry (March 2021–2022)
 Major General Charles Collins (2022–present)

References

Senior appointments of the British Army